Metástasis (meaning "metastasis" in Spanish) is a Colombian telenovela series, a Spanish language remake of the American crime drama Breaking Bad that transposes the events of the original from the United States to Colombia. It heavily follows the storyline for all five seasons of Breaking Bad, with major alterations to its pacing, visual style, and subplot elements. 

The series premiered on June 8, 2014 until September 18, 2014, airing a total of 62 episodes. It has been broadcast in Chile, Venezuela, Peru, the United States, Costa Rica and Mexico, among other countries, by Fox Latin America.

Plot 

Walter Blanco is a frustrated high school chemistry teacher, married to his unexpectedly-pregnant wife Cielo Blanco, and father of his disabled son Walter Blanco Jr.. Walter also works in a car wash in the afternoons. When he is diagnosed with terminal lung cancer, he wonders what will happen to his family when he dies.

Witnessing a raid by the Anti-Narcotics Police organized by his brother-in-law Henry Navarro, Walter recognizes a former student of his, José Miguel Rosas, whom he contacts to manufacture and sell methamphetamine and thus ensure the economic wellbeing of his family. But the approach to the world of drugs and dealing with traffickers and mobsters contaminates Walter's personality, who gradually abandons his straight and predictable personality to become someone without too many scruples when it comes to getting what he wants.

Production 
The idea for a Spanish remake of Breaking Bad was originally conceived due to how cable television is not common in Latin America. The episodes were individually shot in an average of two and a half days, compared to eight for its American counterpart. 

Some changes were made to adapt aspects of Breaking Bads American elements to Metástasis Colombian setting. The outdoor scenes of Metástasis were shot in Bogotá, which has a colder and more mountainous environment compared to the deserts surrounding Albuquerque, New Mexico. Pest exterminators are uncommon in the region, so the main characters pose as demolition experts in the latter half of the fifth season. Saúl Bueno (the show's equivalent of Saul Goodman) demonstrates his legal services on a television talk show rather than through commercials, as legal services cannot be advertised in Colombia. The iconic recreational vehicle which Jesse and Walter use to cook meth is replaced by a school bus, as RVs are rare in Latin America.

Cast

 Diego Trujillo – Walter Blanco (Walter White)
  – José Miguel Rosas (Jesse Pinkman)
  – Cielo Blanco (Skyler White)
 Julián Arango – Henry Navarro (Hank Schrader)
 Luis Eduardo Arango – Saúl Bueno (Saul Goodman)
 Diego Garzón – Walter Blanco Jr. (Walter White Jr.)
 Manuel Gómez – Gustavo Cortéz (Gus Fring)
 Frank Ramírez – Héctor Salamanca
 Damián Alcázar – Tuco Salamanca

Distribution
In Mexico, Televisa's Channel 5 broadcast the series Monday through Friday at midnight.

Series overview

Reception
Vince Gilligan, the original creator of Breaking Bad, praised Metástasis creators for being able to create the original series' entire runtime on a much faster and smaller budget.

References

External links
 
 Series page on Teleset website (in Spanish)
 Metástasis on UniMás

Breaking Bad
2010s Colombian television series
2014 Colombian television series debuts
2014 Colombian television series endings
Colombian television series based on American television series
Spanish-language television shows
Television remakes
Television shows set in Bogotá
Television series by Teleset
Sony Pictures Television telenovelas
Television shows remade overseas
Caracol Televisión telenovelas
Spanish-language telenovelas
Colombian telenovelas
Colombian television series
2014 telenovelas

fr:Breaking Bad#Adaptation latino-américaine